WQLF (102.1 FM; "Q102") is a radio station broadcasting a classic rock format. Licensed to Lena, Illinois, the station serves the Freeport, Illinois area, and is owned by Big Radio.

References

External links

QLF
Classic rock radio stations in the United States
Radio stations established in 2002
2002 establishments in Illinois